Claudia Reiche (born 13 May 1951) is a German diver. She competed in the women's 10 metre platform event at the 1968 Summer Olympics.

References

1951 births
Living people
German female divers
Olympic divers of East Germany
Divers at the 1968 Summer Olympics
Divers from Dresden